In Puerto Rico, boxing is considered a major sport, having produced more amateur and professional world champions than any other sport in its history. Puerto Rico ranks 5th worldwide between countries with most boxing world champions in history (only behind USA, Mexico, UK and Japan).  Also, in year 2004, became the first country to have had, at least, one world champion in every single one of the 17 current boxing weight divisions throughout the history (Provided that John Ruiz is considered as Puerto Rican and not counting Bridgerweight division). Puerto Rico ranks first in champions per capita with an astonishing 16 in every one million people.  February 9, 2008 was the first time that boxers from Puerto Rico had held three of the four major welterweights titles (World Boxing Association, International Boxing Federation and World Boxing Organization) when Carlos Quintana defeated Paul Williams to join Miguel Cotto, and Kermit Cintron as champions in the division.

Individually, Puerto Rican world champions have earned numerous achievements. These include, Wilfredo Gómez's record for most defenses in the super bantamweight division and for most successive knockouts by a titleholder. On March 6, 1976, at age 17, Wilfred Benítez became the youngest world champion in the history of the sport. On September 3, 1994, Daniel Jiménez established a world record for the quickest knockout in a championship fight, defeating Harald Geier in 17 seconds (currently the second fastest). Juan Manuel López is sixth in this category, having defeated César Figueroa in 47 seconds during his first defense. Ossie Ocasio was the first World Boxing Association (WBA) cruiserweight champion, winning it on February 13, 1982. This accomplishment was mimicked in other organizations: José de Jesús, José Ruíz Matos, John John Molina and Héctor Camacho did it in their respective divisions in the World Boxing Organization (WBO). On June 7, 2014, Miguel Cotto made history by becoming Puerto Rico's first four-division world champion. In women's boxing, Amanda Serrano was the first IBF super featherweight champion and the first Puerto Rican boxer (male or female) to win major world titles in seven different weight classes (Camacho made it first, but four of his titles were considered minor world titles). Also, in 2023, Serrano was the first Puerto Rican to be Undisputed world champion in a single division (featherweight), having won the four belts on each of the major boxing organizations (WBO,WBC,IBF and later WBA).

Boxing in Puerto Rico

Boxing was introduced and practiced in a clandestine manner in Puerto Rico while the archipelago was still a Spanish colony. Fights were organized in haciendas among the workers of the sugar and coffee plantations, and the objective was to determine the best fighter among the employees. Following the culmination of the Puerto Rican Campaign and Spanish–American War, American soldiers who were stationed in the main island practiced the sport. During World War I, a championship known as Campeonato Las Casas was held as training for military personnel. Nero Chen, the first Puerto Rican boxer to gain recognition, began his career in these tournaments. The Combat Maneuver Training Center followed this example and organized boxing activities, which they named Los Campeones del Campamento. These were received with enthusiasm by the young recruits. Most of these events were celebrated without restriction due to military jurisdictional limits, although prohibitions were put in place for the civilian population. Illegal matches were organized on the rooftops of residences in Old San Juan, empty terrain's in El Condado and in hippodromes.

Outside of the island, legendary opera tenor Antonio Paoli, fell on economic hardship due to the closing of european opera houses during the first world war. He decided to change careers and entered a period of training making his boxing debut in London in 1916. Paoli won his first 5 fights but injured his wrist in his 6th bout, deciding to retire.
The fact that a celebrity of his stature, who had been bestowed honors for his musical prowess by the pope, the spanish monarchs and the russian czar, would so quickly choose boxing as an alternate career shows how popular and deeply embedded in the culture of the island boxing was, even during its clandestine era.https://en.m.wikipedia.org/wiki/Antonio_Paoli

By 1924, several young men were being taught to box by Gregario Rosa, a boxer who had won the featherweight championship of the Atlantic Fleet while serving in the Navy. Rosa established "Jack Dempsey Physical Culture and Boxing Club", a gym where he continued instructing more pugilists; however, the local police department would go in and arrest any boxer that participated in a card (organized boxing match). At times they were surprised to discover that several members of the law enforcement agencies and government were involved. In one case they discovered a group of police officers, including a colonel, two members of the governor's cabinet, numerous legislators and a judge at an event. The charges were archived; the decision was justified with a statement that said: "How will we have a boxing world champion if we don't let the boys learn how to box?"

In 1926, a boxing venue was opened in a military facility known as Cuartel de Ballajá; a fight card was organized weekly. Legislator Lorenzo Coballes Gandía redacted a proposal to legalize boxing, which was signed by governor Horace Mann Towner in May 1927. Consequently, the Primera Comisión Atlética de Boxeo (The First Athletic Boxing Commission) was created; this became the first organization dedicated to sanctioned boxing in Puerto Rico. Estadio Universal (Universal Stadium) became the first venue to organize legal boxing cards. The first event featured a fight between Enrique Chaffardet and Al Clemens as the main event, which was declared a draw by the judges. New stadiums were built in Bayamón, Caguas, Mayagüez, Ponce, Aguadilla and San Juan. The first Puerto Rican to win a world championship was Sixto Escobar, who won it on June 26, 1934. During the 1960s and 1970s, there was an increase in the number of pugilists who achieved this recognition. Including Wilfred Benítez who on March 6, 1976, became the youngest world champion in history at 17 years old. This tendency continued during the following two decades, reaching its peak between the 1980s and 1990s. There was a slight decline in the 1990s. Félix Trinidad was Puerto Rico's most notable champion during this period. The 2000s brought another increase, as over a dozen boxers won world championships.

Héctor García, Dommys Delgado Berty, Francisco Varcárcel and José Peñagaricano have served as presidents of the Puerto Rico Boxing Commission. This organization gained more prominence in 1985 when it received full control as the sanctioning body in any professional fight organized in Puerto Rico. In 2000, the commission's regulation was revised to exclude professional wrestling, which up to that point had been under its scope. This was Peñagaricano's first proposal on taking office, since he considered professional wrestling "a spectacle instead of a sport like boxing". During the following decades, the Puerto Rico Boxing Commission became the first governing body to have a female president when Delgado Berty served from 1986 to 1988. It became the first commission to require pre-fight weigh-ins, a measure that was at first criticized, but was later adopted by other boxing organizations. In 2007, David Bernier, then Secretary of Recreation and Sports, approved a new rule in the boxing organization's regulation that prohibited the signing of any pugilist younger than 18 years old as a professional. In 2011, women's boxing saw an increase in popularity, gaining mainstream attention. This was fueled by the championships won by Ada Veléz and Amanda Serrano, as well as Kiria Tapia becoming the first Pan American champion in her division.

List of male world champions
 Major Sanctioning Body
 Undisputed World Championship
 Lineal World Championship

List of female world champions

Current titleholders

Men

World champions

Women

International Boxing Hall of Fame

See also

Sport in Puerto Rico
List of current world boxing champions
List of boxing triple champions
List of boxing quadruple champions
List of boxing quintuple champions
List of boxing sextuple champions
List of WBC world champions
List of WBA world champions
List of IBF world champions
List of WBO world champions
List of IBO world champions
Septuple Champion

References

Footnotes

Sources

Notes

Men's titlists

I:
II:
III:
IV:
V:
VI:
VII:
VIII:
IX:
X:
XI:
XII:
XIII:
XIV:
XV:
XVI:
XVII:
XVIII:
XIX:
XX:
XXI:
XXII:
XXIII:
XXIV:
XXV:
XXVI:
XXVII:
XXVIII:
XXIX:
XXX:
XXXI:
XXXII:
XXXIII:
XXXIV:
XXXV:
XXXVI:
XXXVII:
XXXVIII:
XXXIX:
XL:
XLI:
XLII:
XLIII:
XLIV:
XLV:
XLVI:
XLVII:
XLVIII:
XLIX:
L:
LI:
LII:
LIII:
LIV:
LV:
LVI:
LVII:
LVIII:
LIX:
LX:
LXI:
LXII:
LXIII:
LXIV:

Women's titlists

A:
B:
C:
D:

External links
 Yahoo! Sports – Boxing
 International Boxing Hall of Fame

world boxing champions, List of Puerto Rican
Puerto Rican world boxing champions, List of

Puerto Rican
Boxing in Puerto Rico